"Nothing Can Change This Love" is a song by American singer-songwriter Sam Cooke. It was released as a single on September 11, 1962 by RCA Victor. The song peaked at No. 2 on Billboard Hot R&B Singles chart, and also charted at No. 12 on the Hot 100. The song later got on the album Mr. Soul.

Background
Cooke had first attempted to record "Nothing Can Change This Love" in an earlier session on February 15, 1962, with a decidedly more doo-wop flair. Recorded the night before he was to return to the road for tours, Cooke was determined to record the song, but was unable to get into the RCA studio until past midnight. The song was recorded in eight takes.

RCA issued the song as a single two and a half weeks later, and its sales rivaled that of Cooke's most recent success, "Bring It On Home to Me".

Personnel
"Nothing Can Change This Love" was recorded on August 23, 1962 at RCA Studio 1 in Hollywood, California. The musicians also recorded "I'm Gonna Forget About You" the same day. The session was conducted and arranged by René Hall, producers were Hugo & Luigi. Credits adapted from the liner notes to the 2003 compilation Portrait of a Legend: 1951–1964.

Sam Cooke – vocals
Edward Beal – piano
René Hall – guitar
Earl Palmer – drums
Joseph Coppin – cello
Frederick Seykora – cello
Allan Harshman – viola
Samuel Boghossian – viola
Israel Baker – violin
Robert Barené – violin

John DeVoogdt – violin
Harold Dickterow – violin
Elliot Fisher – violin
William Kurasch – violin
Leonard Malarsky – violin
Gareth Nuttycombe – violin
Isadore Roman – violin
Ralph Schaeffer – violin
Darrell Terwilliger – violin

Charts and certifications

Weekly charts

Popular culture
The song also appears prominently in the Hulu miniseries 11.22.63, based on the novel by Stephen King.

References

1962 singles
Sam Cooke songs
Songs written by Sam Cooke
1962 songs
Song recordings produced by Hugo & Luigi
Soul ballads
RCA Victor singles